This is a list of Assamese languages films released in the 1970s. 57 movies were released in this decade.

References

External links
History of Assamese Cinema, rupaliparda.com.

Assamese
1970s
Assamese